The 1917 Auckland City mayoral election was part of the New Zealand local elections held that same year. In 1917, elections were held for the Mayor of Auckland plus other local government positions including twenty-one city councillors. The polling was conducted using the standard first-past-the-post electoral method.

Incumbent mayor James Gunson was declared re-elected unopposed, with no other candidates emerging.

Councillor results

 

 
 
 
 

 
 
 
 

Table footnotes:
<noinclude>

Notes

References

Mayoral elections in Auckland
1917 elections in New Zealand
Politics of the Auckland Region
1910s in Auckland